Pygmaeascincus is a genus of skinks, lizards in the family Scincidae. All member species are endemic to Australia.

Species
The following three species, listed alphabetically by specific name, are recognized as being valid:

Pygmaeascincus koshlandae  – fine-browed dwarf skink
Pygmaeascincus sadlieri  – Magnetic Island dwarf skink
Pygmaeascincus timlowi  – dwarf litter-skink

Nota bene: A binomial authority in parentheses indicates that the species was originally described in a genus other than Pygmaeascincus.

Etymology
The specific name, sadlieri, is in honor of Australian herpetologist Ross Allen Sadlier.

The specific name, timlowi, is in honor of Australian biologist Tim Low.

References

Further reading
Couper, Patrick J.; Hoskin, Conrad J. (2014). "A new genus to accommodate three skinks currently assigned to Menetia (Lacertilia: Scincidae)". Zootaxa 3884 (6): 597–599. (Pygmaeascincus, new genus).

 
Lizard genera
Taxa named by Patrick J. Couper
Taxa named by Conrad J. Hoskin